Rothia dayremi is a moth of the family Noctuidae. This moth occurs in Madagascar.

References
Oberthür, C. 1909b. Description de Lépidoptères africains. - Etudes de Lépidoptérologie comparée 3:93–99.

Agaristinae
Moths of Madagascar
Moths of Africa
Moths described in 1909